Stronge may refer to:

Abel Nathaniel Bankole Stronge (born in Freetown, Sierra Leone) is the current speaker of Parliament of Sierra Leone
Francis Stronge KCMG (1856–1924), senior British diplomat and the second son of Sir John Calvert Stronge and Lady Margaret Stronge
James Stronge (Mid-Armagh MP) (1932–1981), soldier and Unionist MP in the Parliament of Northern Ireland, and the later Northern Ireland Assembly
Norman Stronge, MC, PC (NI), JP (1894–1981), senior Unionist politician in Northern Ireland

See also
Stronge Baronets, Northern Irish landowners of Tynan Abbey, County Armagh, and Lizard Manor, Aghadowey, County Londonderry
Sir James Stronge, 1st Baronet (1750–1804)
Sir James Stronge, 3rd Baronet DL, JP (1811–1885)
Sir James Stronge, 5th Baronet (1849–1928)

de:Stronge